A solar symbol is a symbol representing the Sun. 
Common solar symbols include circles (with or without rays), crosses, and spirals.
In religious iconography, personifications of the Sun or solar attributes are often indicated by means of a  halo  or a radiate crown.

When the systematic study of comparative mythology first became popular in the 19th century, scholarly opinion tended to over-interpret historical myths and iconography in terms of "solar symbolism". 
This was especially the case with Max Müller and his followers beginning in the 1860s in the context of Indo-European studies. Many "solar symbols" claimed  in the 19th century, such as the swastika, triskele, Sun cross, etc. have tended to be interpreted more conservatively in scholarship since the later 20th century.

Solar disk

The basic element of most solar symbols is the circular solar disk.
 
The disk can be modified in various ways, notably by adding rays (found in the Bronze Age in Egyptian depictions of Aten) or  a cross. In the ancient Near East, the solar disk could also be modified by addition of the Uraeus (rearing cobra), and in ancient Mesopotamia it was shown with wings.

Bronze Age writing
Egyptian hieroglyphs have a large inventory of solar symbolism because of the central position of solar deities (Ra, Horus, Aten etc.) in ancient Egyptian religion.

The main logogram for "Sun" was a representation of the solar disk, N5 (Gardiner N5), with or without a dot or circle in the center, with a variant including the Uraeus, N6 (N6).

The "Sun" logogram in early Chinese writing, beginning with the oracle bone script (c. 12th century BC) also shows the solar disk with a central dot (analogous to the Egyptian hieroglyph); under the influence of the writing brush, this character evolved into a square shape (modern 日).

Classical era

In the Greek and European world, until approximately the 16th century, the astrological symbol for the Sun was a disk with a single ray, . This is the form, for example, in Johannes Kamateros' 12th century Compendium of Astrology.

Astronomical symbol
The modern astronomical symbol for the Sun, a circled dot, was first used in the Renaissance.

Rayed depictions 

A circular disk with alternating triangular and wavy rays emanating from it is a frequent symbol or artistic depiction of the sun.

Antiquity

The ancient Mesopotamian  "star of Shamash" could be represented with either eight wavy rays, or with four wavy and four triangular rays.

The Vergina Sun (also known as the Star of Vergina, Macedonian Star, or Argead Star) is a rayed solar symbol appearing in ancient Greek art from the 6th to 2nd centuries BC. The Vergina Sun appears in art variously with sixteen, twelve, or eight triangular rays.

Bianchini's planisphere, produced in the 2nd century,
has a circlet with rays radiating from it.

Sun with face

The iconographic tradition of depicting the Sun with rays and with a human face developed in Western tradition in the high medieval period and became widespread in the Renaissance, harking back to the Sun god (Sol/Helios) wearing a radiate crown in classical antiquity.

Sunburst

The sunburst was the badge of king Edward III of England, and has thus become the badge of office of Windsor Herald.

Modern pictogram

The modern pictogram representing the Sun as a circle with rays, often eight in number (indicated by either straight lines or triangles; Unicode Miscellaneous Symbols  U+2600;  U+263C) indicates "clear weather" in weather forecasts, originally in television forecasts in the 1970s.
The Unicode 6.0 Miscellaneous Symbols and Pictographs block introduced another set of weather pictograms, including "white sun" without rays 1F323 , as well as "sun with face" U+1F31E .

The "sun with rays" pictogram is also used to represent the "high brightness" setting in display devices, encoded separately by Unicode 6.0 U+1F506   (Miscellaneous Symbols and Pictographs).

Crosses  

 The "sun cross" or "solar wheel" (🜨) is often considered to represent the four seasons and the tropical year, and therefore the Sun (though as an astronomical symbol, it represented the Earth).
In the prehistoric religion of Bronze Age Europe, crosses in circles appear frequently on artifacts identified as cult items. An example from the Nordic Bronze Age is the  "miniature standard" with amber inlay revealing a cross shape when held against the light (National Museum of Denmark). The Bronze Age symbol has also been connected with the spoked chariot wheel, which at the time was four-spoked (compare the Linear B ideogram 243 "wheel" ).  In the context of a culture that celebrated the Sun chariot, the wheel may thus have had a solar connotation (c.f. the Trundholm sun chariot).

The Arevakhach (solar cross) symbol often found in Armenian memorial stelae is claimed as an ancient Armenian solar symbol of eternity and light.

Some Sami shaman drums have the Beaivi Sami sun symbol that resembles a sun cross.

The swastika has been a long-standing symbol of good fortune in Eurasian cultures: its appropriation by the Nazi Party from 1920 to 1945 is a brief moment in its history. It may be derived from the sun cross, and is another solar symbol in some contexts.
It is used among Buddhists ("manji"), Jains, and Hindus; and many other cultures, though not necessarily as a solar symbol. Also see Malkh-Festival.

The "Black Sun"  is a 'sun wheel' with twelve-fold rotational symmetry. The design was incorporated as a mosaic into a floor of Wewelsburg Castle during the Nazi era and may have been inspired by Alemannic Iron Age swastika-like designs in Migration-period Zierscheiben. It has been adopted by modern Satanist groups and neo-Nazis.

The Kolovrat, or in Polish "Słoneczko", represents the Sun in Slavic neopaganism.

Modern flags and emblems
Official insignia which incorporate rayed solar symbols include the flag of Uruguay, the flag of Kiribati, some versions of the flag of Argentina, the Irish Defence Forces cap badge, and the 1959–1965 coat of arms of Iraq.

The depictions of the sun on the flags of the Republic of China (Taiwan), Kazakhstan, Kurdistan, the Brazilian state of Pernambuco, and Nepal have only straight (triangular) rays; that of Kyrgyzstan has only curvy rays; while that of the Philippines has short diverging rays grouped into threes.

Another rayed form of the sun has simple radial lines dividing the background into two colors, as in the military flags of Japan and the flag of North Macedonia, and in the top parts of the flags of Tibet and Arizona.

The flag of New Mexico is based on the Zia sun symbol which has four groups of four parallel rays emanating symmetrically from a central circle.

Code points in Unicode

There are code points in Unicode for various characters to represent the sun, as shown in the box.

See also

Notes

References

External links 
Symbols.com list and description of sun symbols
Origins and Meanings of the Eight-point Star 

Lists of symbols
Sun in culture
History of astrology
Heraldic charges
Astronomical symbols